This is a list of public art in Cass County, Indiana.

This list applies only to works of public art accessible in an outdoor public space. For example, this does not include artwork visible inside a museum.  

Most of the works mentioned are sculptures. When this is not the case (e.g., sound installation,) it is stated next to the title.

Galveston

Logansport

Notes

Cass County
Tourist attractions in Cass County, Indiana